Issouf Paro (born 16 October 1994) is a Burkinabé international footballer who plays for  club Concarneau as a centre-back. He previously played in his homeland for Étoile Filante and in South Africa with Santos.

Club career
Born in Bobo-Dioulasso, Paro has played for Étoile Filante, Santos, Niort and Niort II.

On 21 June 2022, Paro joined Concarneau on a one-season deal.

International career
Paro made his international debut in 2015, and was named in the squad for the 2017 Africa Cup of Nations.

References

1994 births
Living people
Burkinabé footballers
Burkina Faso international footballers
Étoile Filante de Ouagadougou players
Santos F.C. (South Africa) players
Chamois Niortais F.C. players
US Concarneau players
National First Division players
Ligue 2 players
Championnat National 3 players
Association football defenders
Burkinabé expatriate footballers
Burkinabé expatriate sportspeople in South Africa
Expatriate soccer players in South Africa
Burkinabé expatriate sportspeople in France
Expatriate footballers in France
2017 Africa Cup of Nations players
21st-century Burkinabé people